{{nihongo|Nanban trade|南蛮貿易|Nanban bōeki|"Southern barbarian trade"}} or the {{nihongo|Nanban trade period|南蛮貿易時代|Nanban bōeki jidai|"Southern barbarian trade period"}} was a period in the history of Japan from the arrival of Europeans in 1543 to the first Sakoku Seclusion Edicts of isolationism in 1614. Nanban (南蛮 Lit. "Southern barbarian") is a Japanese word which had been used to designate people from Southern China, Ryukyu islands, Indian Ocean and Southeast Asia centuries prior to the arrival of the first Europeans. For instance, according to the Nihongi ryaku (日本紀略), Dazaifu, the administrative center of Kyūshū, reported that the Nanban (southern barbarians) pirates, who were identified as Amami islanders by the Shōyūki (982–1032 for the extant portion), pillaged a wide area of Kyūshū in 997. In response, Dazaifu ordered Kikaijima (貴駕島) to arrest the Nanban.

The Nanban trade as a form of European contact began with Portuguese explorers, missionaries, and merchants in the Sengoku period and established long-distance overseas trade routes with Japan. The resulting cultural exchange included the introduction of matchlock firearms, galleon-style shipbuilding, and Christianity to Japan. The Nanban trade declined in the early Edo period with the rise of the Tokugawa Shogunate which feared the influence of Christianity in Japan, particularly the Roman Catholicism of the Portuguese. The Tokugawa issued a series of Sakoku policies that increasingly isolated Japan from the outside world and limited European trade to Dutch traders on the island of Dejima.

 First contacts 

 Japanese accounts of Europeans 

Following contact with the Portuguese on Tanegashima in 1542, the Japanese were at first rather wary of the newly arrived foreigners. The culture shock was quite strong, especially because Europeans were not able to understand the Japanese writing system nor accustomed to using chopsticks.

 European accounts of Japan 

The first comprehensive and systematic report of a European about Japan is the Tratado em que se contêm muito sucinta e abreviadamente algumas contradições e diferenças de costumes entre a gente de Europa e esta província de Japão of Luís Fróis, in which he described Japanese life concerning the roles and duties of men and women, children, Japanese food, weapons, medicine, medical treatment, diseases, books, houses, gardens, horses, ships and cultural aspects of Japanese life like dances and music. Several decades later, when Hasekura Tsunenaga became the first Japanese official arriving in Europe, his presence, habits and cultural mannerisms gave rise to many picturesque descriptions circulating among the public:
"They never touch food with their fingers, but instead use two small sticks that they hold with three fingers."
"They blow their noses in soft silky papers the size of a hand, which they never use twice, so that they throw them on the ground after usage, and they were delighted to see our people around them precipitate themselves to pick them up."
"Their Scimitar -alike swords and daggers cut so well that they can cut a soft paper just by putting it on the edge and by blowing on it." ("Relations of Mme de St Tropez", October 1615, Bibliothèque Inguimbertine, Carpentras).

Renaissance Europeans were quite fond of Japan's immense richness in precious metals, mainly owing to Marco Polo's accounts of gilded temples and palaces, but also to the relative abundance of surface ores characteristic of a volcanic country, before large-scale deep-mining became possible in Industrial times. Japan was to become a major exporter of copper and silver during the period. At its peak, 1/3 of the world's silver came from Japan.

Japan was also noted for its comparable or even exceptional levels of population and urbanization with the nations of the West (see List of countries by population in 1600), and some Europeans became quite fascinated with Japan, with Alessandro Valignano even writing that the Japanese "excel not only all the other Oriental peoples, they surpass the Europeans as well".

Early European visitors noted the quality of Japanese craftsmanship and metalsmithing. The later sources, most notably those written after the end of Japan's isolation period, also report Japanese blades and swords in general as good quality weapons with a notable artistic value.

 Portuguese trade in the 16th century 

Ever since 1514 that the Portuguese had traded with China from Malacca, and the year after the first Portuguese landfall in Japan, trade commenced between Malacca, China, and Japan. The Chinese Emperor had decreed an embargo against Japan as a result of piratical wokou raids against China – consequently, Chinese goods were in scarce supply in Japan and so, the Portuguese found a lucrative opportunity to act as middlemen between the two realms.

Trade with Japan was initially open to any, but in 1550, the Portuguese Crown monopolized the rights to trade with Japan. Henceforth, once a year a fidalgo was awarded the rights for a single trade venture to Japan with considerable privileges, such as the title of captain-major of the voyage to Japan, with authority over any Portuguese subjects in China or Japan while he was in port, and the right to sell his post, should he lack the necessary funds to undertake the enterprise. He could charter a royal vessel or purchase his own, at about 40,000 xerafins. His ship would set sail from Goa, called at Malacca and China before proceeding to Japan and back.

In 1554, captain-major Leonel de Sousa negotiated with Chinese authorities the re-legalization of Portuguese trade in China, which was followed by the foundation of Macau in 1557 to support this trade.

The state of civil-war in Japan was also highly beneficial to the Portuguese, as each competing lord sought to attract trade to their domains by offering better conditions. In 1571, the fishing village of Nagasaki became the definitive anchorage of the Portuguese and in 1580, its lord, Omura Sumitada, the first Japanese lord to convert to Christianity, leased it to the Jesuits "in perpetuity". The city subsequently evolved from an unimportant fishing village to a prosperous and cosmopolitan community, the entirety of which was Christian. In time, the city would be graced with a painting school, a hospital, a charitable institution (the Misericórdia) and a Jesuit college.

 Vessels 
thumb|Portuguese traders landing in Nagasaki
Among the vessels involved in the trade linking Goa and Japan, the most famous were Portuguese carracks, slow but large enough to hold a great deal of merchandise and enough provisions to travel safely through such a lengthy and often hazardous (because of pirates) journey. These ships initially had about 400–600 tons burden but later on could reach as many as over 1200 or 1600 tons in cargo capacity, a rare few reaching as many as 2000 tons — they were the largest vessels afloat on Earth, and easily twice or three times larger than common galleons of the time, rivalled only in size by the Spanish Manila galleons. Many of these were built at the royal Indo-Portuguese shipyards at Goa, Bassein or Daman, out of high-quality Indian teakwood rather than European pine, and their build quality became renowned; the Spanish in Manila favoured Portuguese-built vessels, and commented that they were not only cheaper than their own, but "lasted ten times as long".

The Portuguese referred to this vessel as the nau da prata ("silver carrack") or nau do trato ("trade carrack"); the Japanese dubbed them kurofune, meaning "black ships", on account of the colour of their hulls, painted black with pitch for water-tightening, and later the name was extended to refer to Matthew C. Perry's black warships that reopened Japan to the wider world in 1853.

In the 16th century, large junks belonging to private owners from Macau often accompanied the great ship to Japan, about two or three; these could reach about 400 or 500 tons burden. After 1618, the Portuguese switched to using smaller and more maneuverable pinnaces and galliots, to avoid interception from Dutch raiders.

 Traded goods 
By far the most valuable commodities exchanged in the "nanban trade" were Chinese silks for Japanese silver, which was then traded in China for more silk. Although accurate statistics are lacking, it's been estimated that roughly half of Japan's yearly silver output was exported, most of it through the Wokou (Japanese and Chinese), Ryukyuans and Portuguese, amounting to about 18 – 20 tons in silver bullion. The English merchant Peter Mundy estimated that Portuguese investment at Canton ascended to 1,500,000 silver taels or 2,000,000 Spanish dollars. The Portuguese also exported surplus silk from Macau to Goa and Europe via Manila.

Nonetheless, numerous other items were also transactioned, such as gold, Chinese porcelain, musk, and rhubarb; Arabian horses, Bengal tigers and peacocks; fine Indian scarlet cloths, calico and chintz; European manufactured items such as Flemish clocks and Venetian glass and Portuguese wine and rapiers; in return for Japanese copper, lacquer and lacquerware or weapons (as purely exotic items to be displayed in Europe). Japanese lacquerware attracted European aristocrats and missionaries from Europe, and western style chests and church furniture were exported in response to their requests.

Japanese captured in battle were also sold by their compatriots to the Portuguese as slaves, but the Japanese would also sell family members they could not afford to sustain because of the civil-war. According to Prof. Boxer, both old and modern Asian authors have "conveniently overlooked" their part in the enslavement of their countrymen. They were well regarded for their skills and warlike character, and some ended as far as India and even Europe, some armed retainers or as concubines or slaves to other slaves of the Portuguese.

In 1571, King Sebastian of Portugal issued a ban on the enslavement of both Chinese and Japanese, probably fearing the negative effects it might have on proselytization efforts as well as the standing diplomacy between the countries. Toyotomi Hideyoshi, the de facto ruler of Japan, enforced the end of the enslavement of his countrymen starting in 1587 and it was suppressed shortly thereafter. However, Hideyoshi later sold Korean prisoners of war captured during the Japanese invasions of Korea (1592–1598) as slaves to the Portuguese.

The overall profits from the Japan trade, carried on through the black ship, was estimated to ascend to over 600,000 cruzados, according to various contemporary authors such as Diogo do Couto, Jan Huygen van Linschoten and William Adams. A captain-major who invested at Goa 20,000 cruzados to this venture could expect 150,000 cruzados in profits upon returning. The value of Portuguese exports from Nagasaki during the 16th century were estimated to ascend to over 1,000,000 cruzados, reaching as many as 3,000,000 in 1637. The Dutch estimated this was the equivalent of some 6,100,000 guilders, almost as much as the entire founding capital of the Dutch East India Company (VOC) (6,500,000 guilders). VOC profits in all of Asia amounted to "just" about 1,200,000 guilders, all its assets worth 9,500,000 guilders.

The monopoly of Portugal on trade with Japan for a European nation started being challenged by Spanish ships from Manila after 1600 (until 1620), the Dutch after 1609 and the English in 1613 (until 1623). Nonetheless, it was found that neither the Dutch nor the Spanish could effectively replace the Portuguese because Portugal had privileged access to Chinese markets and investors through Macau. The Portuguese were only definitively banned in 1638 after the Shimabara Rebellion, on the grounds that they smuggled priests into Japan aboard their vessels.

 Dutch trade 

The Dutch, who, rather than "Nanban" were called "Kōmō" (Jp: 紅毛, lit. "Red Hair") by the Japanese, first arrived in Japan in 1600, on board the Liefde ("liefde" meaning "love"). Their pilot was William Adams, the first Englishman to reach Japan.

In 1605, two of the Liefdes crew were sent to Pattani by Tokugawa Ieyasu, to invite Dutch trade to Japan. The head of the Pattani Dutch trading post, Victor Sprinckel, refused on the ground that he was too busy dealing with Portuguese opposition in Southeast Asia. In 1609 however, the Dutchman Jacques Specx arrived with two ships in Hirado, and through Adams obtained trading privileges from Ieyasu.

The Dutch also engaged in piracy and naval combat to weaken Portuguese and Spanish shipping in the Pacific, and ultimately became the only westerners to be allowed access to Japan from the small enclave of Dejima after 1638 and for the next two centuries.

 Technological and cultural exchanges 

The Japanese were introduced to several new technologies and cultural practices (so were the Europeans to Japanese, see Japonism), whether in the military area (the arquebus, European-style cuirasses, European ships), religion (Christianity), decorative art, language (integration to Japanese of a Western vocabulary) and culinary: the Portuguese introduced the tempura and european-style confectionery, creating , "southern barbarian confectionery", with confectioneries like castella, konpeitō, aruheitō, karumera, keiran sōmen, bōro and bisukauto.
 Tanegashima guns 

The Japanese were interested in Portuguese hand-held guns. The first two Europeans to reach Japan in the year 1543 were the Portuguese traders António da Mota and Francisco Zeimoto (Fernão Mendes Pinto claimed to have arrived on this ship as well, but this is in direct conflict with other data he presents), arriving on a Chinese ship at the southern island of Tanegashima where they introduced hand-held guns for trade. The Japanese were already familiar with gunpowder weaponry (invented by, and transmitted from China), and had been using basic Chinese originated guns and cannon tubes called "Teppō" (鉄砲 "Iron cannon") for around 270 years before the arrival of the Portuguese. In comparison, the Portuguese guns were light, had a matchlock firing mechanism, and were easy to aim. Because the Portuguese-made firearms were introduced into Tanegashima, the arquebus was ultimately called Tanegashima in Japan. At that time, Japan was in the middle of a civil war called the Sengoku period (Warring States period).

Within a year after the first trade in guns, Japanese swordsmiths and ironsmiths managed to reproduce the matchlock mechanism and mass-produce the Portuguese guns. Barely fifty years later, "by the end of the 16th century, guns were almost certainly more common in Japan than in any other country in the world", its armies equipped with a number of guns dwarfing any contemporary army in Europe (Perrin). The guns were strongly instrumental in the unification of Japan under Toyotomi Hideyoshi and Tokugawa Ieyasu, as well as in the invasions of Korea in 1592 and 1597.  The daimyo who initiated the unification of Japan, Oda Nobunaga, made extensive use of guns (arquebus) when playing a key role in the Battle of Nagashino, as dramatised in Akira Kurosawa's 1980 film Kagemusha (Shadow Warrior).

 Red seal ships 

European ships (galleons) were also quite influential in the Japanese shipbuilding industry and actually stimulated many Japanese ventures abroad.

The Shogunate established a system of commercial ventures on licensed ships called , which sailed throughout East and Southeast Asia for trade. These ships incorporated many elements of galleon design, such as sails, rudder, and gun disposition. They brought to Southeast Asian ports many Japanese traders and adventurers, who sometimes became quite influential in local affairs, such as the adventurer Yamada Nagamasa in Siam, or later became Japanese popular icons, such as Tenjiku Tokubei.

By the beginning of the 17th century, the shogunate had built, usually with the help of foreign experts, several ships of purely Nanban design, such as the galleon San Juan Bautista, which crossed the Pacific two times on embassies to Nueva España (Mexico).

 Catholicism in Japan 

With the arrival of the leading Jesuit Francis Xavier in 1549, Catholicism progressively developed as a major religious force in Japan. Although the tolerance of Western "padres" was initially linked to trade, Catholics could claim around 200,000 converts by the end of the 16th century, mainly located in the southern island of Kyūshū. The Jesuits managed to obtain jurisdiction over the trading city of Nagasaki.

The first reaction from the kampaku Hideyoshi came in 1587 when he promulgated the interdiction of Christianity and ordered the departure of all "padres". This resolution was not followed upon however (only 3 out of 130 Jesuits left Japan), and the Jesuits were essentially able to pursue their activities. Hideyoshi had written that:
"1. Japan is a country of the Gods, and for the padres to come hither and preach a devilish law, is a reprehensible and devilish thing ...2. For the padres to come to Japan and convert people to their creed, destroying Shinto and Buddhist temples to this end, is a hitherto unseen and unheard-of thing ... to stir the canaille to commit outrages of this sort is something deserving of severe punishment." (From Boxer, The Christian Century in Japan)

Hideyoshi's reaction to Christianity proved stronger when the Spanish galleon San Felipe was wrecked in Japan in 1597. The incident led to twenty-six Christians (6 Franciscans, 17 of their Japanese neophytes, and 3 Japanese Jesuit lay brothers – included by mistake) being crucified in Nagasaki on February 5, 1597. It seems Hideyoshi's decision was taken following encouragements by the Jesuits to expel the rival order, his being informed by the Spanish that military conquest usually followed Catholic proselytism, and by his own desire to take over the cargo of the ship. Although close to a hundred churches were destroyed, most of the Jesuits remained in Japan.

The final blow came with Tokugawa Ieyasu's firm interdiction of Christianity in 1614, which led to underground activities by the Jesuits and to their participation in Hideyori's revolt in the Siege of Osaka (1614–15). Repression of Catholicism became virulent after Ieyasu's death in 1616, leading to the torturing and killing of around 2,000 Christians (70 westerners and the rest Japanese) and the apostasy of the remaining 200–300,000. The last major reaction of the Christians in Japan was the Shimabara rebellion in 1637.  Thereafter, Catholicism in Japan was driven underground as the so-called "Hidden Christians".

 Other Nanban influences 
The Nanban also had various other influences:
 Nanbandō (南蛮胴) designates a type of cuirass covering the trunk in one piece, a design imported from Europe.
 Nanbanbijutsu (南蛮美術) generally describes Japanese art with Nanban themes or influenced by Nanban designs(See Nanban art).
 Nanbanga (南蛮画) designates the numerous pictorial representations that were made of the new foreigners and defines a whole style category in Japanese art (See Namban art and an example at: or )
 Nanbannuri (南蛮塗り) describes lacquers decorated in the Portuguese style, which were very popular items from the late 16th century.
 Nanbangashi (南蛮菓子) is a variety of sweets derived from Portuguese or Spanish recipes. The most popular sweets are "Kasutera" (カステラ), named after Castile, and  "Konpeitō" (金平糖 こんぺいとう), from the Portuguese word "confeito" ("sugar candy"), and "Biscuit"(ビスケット), etc.  These "Southern barbarian" sweets are on sale in many Japanese supermarkets today.
  was the first Christian church in Kyoto. With support from Oda Nobunaga, the Jesuit Padre Gnecchi-Soldo Organtino established this church in 1576. Eleven years later (1587), Nanbanji was destroyed by Toyotomi Hideyoshi. Currently, The bell is preserved as "Nanbanji-no-kane" (the Bell of Nanbanji) at Shunkoin temple in Kyoto.Shunkoin Temple
 Nanbanzuke (南蛮漬) is a dish of fried fish marinated in vinegar, thought to be derived from the Portuguese escabeche.
 Chikin nanban' (チキン南蛮) is a dish of fried battered chicken dipped in a vinegary sauce derived from nanbanzuke and served with tartar sauce.  Invented in Miyazaki in the 1960s, it is now widely popular across Japan.

 Decline of Nanban exchanges 
After the country was pacified and unified by Tokugawa Ieyasu in 1603 however, Japan progressively closed itself to the outside world, mainly because of the rise of Christianity.

By 1650, except for the trade outpost of Dejima in Nagasaki, for the Netherlands, and some trade with China, foreigners were subject to the death penalty, and Christian converts were persecuted. Guns were almost completely eradicated to revert to the more "civilized" sword. Travel abroad and the building of large ships were also prohibited. Thence started a period of seclusion, peace, prosperity and mild progress known as the Edo period.  But not long after, in the 1650s, the production of Japanese export porcelain increased greatly when civil war put the main Chinese center of porcelain production, in Jingdezhen, out of action for several decades. For the rest of the 17th century most Japanese porcelain production was in Kyushu for export through the Chinese and Dutch. The trade dwindled under renewed Chinese competition by the 1740s, before resuming after the opening of Japan in the 1850s.

The "barbarians" would come back 250 years later, strengthened by industrialization, and end Japan's isolation with the forcible opening of Japan to trade by an American military fleet under the command of Commodore Matthew Perry in 1854.

 Usages of the word "Nanban" Nanban is a Sino-Japanese word derived from the Chinese term Nánmán, originally referring to the peoples of South Asia and Southeast Asia. The Japanese use of Nanban took a new meaning when it came to designate the early Portuguese who first arrived in 1543, and later extended to other Europeans that arrived in Japan. The term Nanban has its origins from the Four Barbarians in the Hua–Yi distinction in the 3rd century in China. Pronunciation of the Chinese Character is Japanised, the 東夷 (Dōngyí) "Eastern Barbarians" called "Tōi" (it includes Japan itself), 南蛮 (Nánmán) "Southern Barbarians" called "Nanban", 西戎 (Xīróng) "Western Barbarians" called "Sei-Jū", and Běidí 北狄 "Northern Barbarians" called "Hoku-Teki". Although Nanban just meant Southeast Asia during the Sengoku and Edo periods, through time the word turned into the meaning "Western person", and "from Nanban" means "Exotic and Curious".

Strictly speaking, Nanban means "Portuguese or Spanish" who were the most popular western foreigners in Japan, while other western people were sometimes called "紅毛人" (Kō-mōjin) "red-haired people" but Kō-mōjin was not as widespread as Nanban. In China, "紅毛" is pronounced Ang mo in Hokkien and is a racist word against white people. Japan later decided to Westernize radically in order to better resist the West and essentially stopped considering the West as fundamentally uncivilized. Words like "Yōfu" (洋風 "western style") and "Ōbeifu" (欧米風 "European-American style)" replaced "Nanban" in most usages.

Still, the exact principle of westernization was Wakon-Yōsai (和魂洋才 "Japanese spirit Western talent"), implying that, although technology may be more advanced in the West, Japanese spirit is better than the West's. Hence though the West may be lacking, it has its strong points, which takes the affront out of calling it "barbarian."

Today the word "Nanban" is only used in a historical context, and is essentially felt as picturesque and affectionate. It can sometimes be used jokingly to refer to Western people or civilization in a cultured manner.

There is an area where Nanban is used exclusively to refer to a certain style and that is cooking and the names of dishes.
Nanban dishes are not American or European, but an odd variety not using soy sauce or miso but rather curry powder and vinegar as their flavoring, a characteristic derived from Indo-Portuguese Goan cuisine. This is because when Portuguese and Spanish dishes were imported into Japan, dishes from Macau and other parts of China were imported as well.

 Timeline 
 1543 – Portuguese sailors (among them possibly Fernão Mendes Pinto) arrive in Tanegashima and transmit the arquebus.
 1549 – Francis Xavier arrives in Kagoshima.
 1556 – Luis de Almeida builds the first hospital, with Western medicine, in Ōita
 1557 – Establishment of Macau by the Portuguese. Dispatch of annual trading ships to Japan.
 1560 – Siege of Moji, the Otomo clan unsuccessfully attempt to seize the Mōri castle of Moji with three Portuguese ships.
 1565 – Battle of Fukuda Bay, the first recorded naval clash between the Europeans and the Japanese
 1570 – Japanese pirates occupy parts of Taiwan, from where they prey on China.
 1571 – Daimyō Ōmura Sumitada assists the Portuguese in establishing the port of Nagasaki.
 1575 – Battle of Nagashino, where firearms are used extensively.
 1577 – First Japanese ships travel to Dang Trong, southern Vietnam.
 1579 – The Jesuit Alessandro Valignano arrives in Japan.
 1580 – Ōmura Sumitada cedes Nagasaki "in perpetuity" to the Society of Jesus.
 – Spain annexes Portugal into a dynastic union
 1580 – Franciscans from Japan escape to Vietnam.
 1584 – Mancio Itō arrives in Lisbon with three other Japanese, accompanied by a Jesuit father.
 1588 – Hideyoshi prohibits piracy.
 1592 – Japan invades Korea in the Seven-Year War with an army of 160.000.
 – First known mention of Red Seal Ships.
 1597 – Martyrdom of 26 Christians (essentially Franciscans) in Nagasaki.
 1598 – Death of Hideyoshi.
 1600 – Arrival of William Adams on the Liefde.
 – The Battle of Sekigahara unites Japan under Tokugawa Ieyasu.
 1602 – Dutch warships attack the Portuguese carrack Santa Catarina near Portuguese Malacca.
 1603 – Establishment of Edo as the seat of Bakufu government.
 – Establishment of the English factory (trading post) at Bantam, Java.
 – Nippo Jisho Japanese to Portuguese dictionary is published by Jesuits in Nagasaki, containing entries for 32,293 Japanese words in Portuguese.
 1605 – Two of William Adams's shipmates are sent to Pattani by Tokugawa Ieyasu, to invite Dutch trade to Japan.
 1609 – The Dutch open a trading factory in Hirado.
 1610 – Destruction of the Nossa Senhora da Graça near Nagasaki, leading to a 2-year hiatus in Portuguese trade
 1612 – Yamada Nagamasa settles in Ayutthaya, Siam.
 1613 – England opens a trading factory in Hirado.
 – Hasekura Tsunenaga leaves for his embassy to the Americas and Europe. He returns in 1620.
 1614 – Expulsion of the Jesuits from Japan. Prohibition of Christianity.
 1615 – Japanese Jesuits start to proselytise in Vietnam.
 1616 – Death of Tokugawa Ieyasu.
 1622 – Mass martyrdom of Christians.
 – Death of Hasekura Tsunenaga.
 1623 – The English close their factory at Hirado, because of unprofitability.
 – Yamada Nagamasa sails from Siam to Japan, with an Ambassador of the Siamese king Songtham. He returns to Siam in 1626.
 – Prohibition of trade with the Spanish Philippines.
 1624 – Interruption of diplomatic relations with Spain.
 – Japanese Jesuits start to proselytise in Siam.
 1628 – Destruction of Takagi Sakuemon's (高木作右衛門) Red Seal ship in Ayutthaya, Siam, by a Spanish fleet. Portuguese trade in Japan is prohibited for 3 years as a reprisal.
 1632 – Death of Tokugawa Hidetada.
 1634 – On orders of shōgun Iemitsu, the artificial island Dejima is built to constrain Portuguese merchants living in Nagasaki.
 1637 – Shimabara Rebellion by Christian peasants.
 1638 – Definitive prohibition of trade with Portugal as result of Shimabara Rebellion blamed on Catholic intrigues.
 1640 – Portugal leaves its 60-year dynastic union with Spain
 1641 – The Dutch trading factory is moved from Hirado to Dejima island.

 See also 
 Nanban art

 Notes 

 References 
 Citations 

 Sources 

 
 
 
 
 

 Further reading 

 Samurai, Mitsuo Kure, Tuttle Publishing, Tokyo. 
 The Origins of Japanese Trade Supremacy. Development and Technology in Asia from 1540 to the Pacific War, Christopher Howe, The University of Chicago Press. 
 Yoshitomo Okamoto, The Namban Art of Japan, translated by Ronald K. Jones, Weatherhill/Heibonsha, New York & Tokyo, 1972
 José Yamashiro, Choque luso no Japão dos séculos XVI e XVII, Ibrasa, 1989
 Armando Martins Janeira, O impacto português sobre a civilização japonesa, Publicações Dom Quixote, Lisboa, 1970
 Wenceslau de Moraes, Relance da história do Japão, 2ª ed., Parceria A. M. Pereira Ltda, Lisboa, 1972
 They came to Japan, an anthology of European reports on Japan, 1543–1640, ed. by Michael Cooper, University of California press, 1995
 João Rodrigues's Account of Sixteenth-Century Japan'', ed. by Michael Cooper, London: The Hakluyt Society, 2001

External links 

 The Wakasa tale: an episode occurred when guns were introduced in Japan, F. A. B. Coutinho
 Tanegashima: the arrival of Europe in Japan, Olof G. Lidin, Nordic Institute of Asian Studies, NIAS Press, 2002
 Nanban folding screens
 Nanban art (Japanese)
 Japanese Art and Western Influence
 Shunkoin Temple the Bell of Nanbanji
 Japan Mint: 2005 International Coin Design Competition, Jury's Special Award – "The Meeting of Cultures" by Vitor Santos (Portugal)

16th century in Japan
17th century in Japan
Economy of feudal Japan
Foreign trade of Japan
History of international trade
History of the foreign relations of Japan
Japan in non-Japanese culture
Japan–Portugal relations
Jesuit Asia missions
Portuguese exploration in the Age of Discovery
Portuguese non-fiction literature